The No. 342 Squadron also known in French as ''Groupe de Bombardement n° 1/20 "Lorraine", was a Free French squadron in the RAF during World War II.

History
No. 342 Squadron was formed on 7 April 1943 at RAF West Raynham with personnel from the Free French Air Forces (Forces aériennes françaises libres) transferred from the Middle East, in particular the personnel of the French escadrilles "Metz" and "Nancy". The squadron was part of No. 2 Group RAF of RAF Bomber Command and equipped with Douglas Mk IIIA Bostons (aka Douglas A-20C Havocs). They later moved with their sister squadron No. 88 Squadron to RAF Hartford Bridge.

While flying Bostons, the aircraft of the Squadron featured in the film The Way to the Stars.

The squadron flew low-level bombing and strafing missions (nicknamed "hedgehopping"), over France and the Netherlands, in particular against V-1 bases in Northern France and selected sites connected with the preparation for the Allied invasion.

In October 1944 the squadron relocated to France from where it continued to support the Allied advance. In March/April 1945 the Bostons were replaced by North American B-25 Mitchells and the squadron relocated to the Netherlands. The squadron was transferred from RAF control to the French Air Force ( Armée de l'Air ) on 2 December 1945.

See also
Free French Flight
List of RAF squadrons

References

Notes

Bibliography

 Halley, James J. The Squadrons of the Royal Air Force & Commonwealth 1918–1988. Tonbridge, Kent, UK: Air Britain (Historians) Ltd., 1988. .
 Jefford, C.G. RAF Squadrons, a Comprehensive record of the Movement and Equipment of all RAF Squadrons and their Antecedents since 1912. Shrewsbury, Shropshire, UK: Airlife Publishing, 1988 (second edition 2001). .
 Rawlings, John D.R. Fighter Squadrons of the RAF and their Aircraft. London: Macdonald and Jane's (Publishers) Ltd., 1969 (2nd edition 1976). .

External links

 Squadron histories for nos. 310–347 sqn on RAFweb
 Squadron histories for nos. 341 sqn at Royal Air Force website
 Squadron Histories
 Pathé News film of a 342 squadron raid on a power station near Paris

341 Squadron
Companions of the Liberation
Military units and formations established in 1943
Military units and formations disestablished in 1945